In the context of nutrition, a mineral is a chemical element required as an essential nutrient by organisms to perform functions necessary for life. However, the four major structural elements in the human body by weight (oxygen, hydrogen, carbon, and nitrogen), are usually not included in lists of major nutrient minerals (nitrogen is considered a "mineral" for plants, as it often is included in fertilizers). These four elements compose about 96% of the weight of the human body, and major minerals (macrominerals) and minor minerals (also called trace elements) compose the remainder.

Nutrient minerals, being elements, cannot be synthesized biochemically by living organisms. Plants get minerals from soil. Most of the minerals in a human diet come from eating plants and animals or from drinking water. As a group, minerals are one of the four groups of essential nutrients, the others of which are vitamins, essential fatty acids, and essential amino acids. The five major minerals in the human body are calcium, phosphorus, potassium, sodium, and magnesium. All of the remaining elements in the human body are called "trace elements". The trace elements that have a specific biochemical function in the human body are iron, chlorine, cobalt, copper, zinc, manganese, molybdenum, iodine, and selenium.

Most chemical elements that are ingested by organisms are in the form of simple compounds. Plants absorb dissolved elements in soils, which are subsequently ingested by the herbivores and omnivores that eat them, and the elements move up the food chain. Larger organisms may also consume soil (geophagia) or use mineral resources, such as salt licks, to obtain limited minerals unavailable through other dietary sources.

Bacteria and fungi play an essential role in the weathering of primary elements that results in the release of nutrients for their own nutrition and for the nutrition of other species in the ecological food chain. One element, cobalt, is available for use by animals only after having been processed into complex molecules (e.g., vitamin B12) by bacteria. Minerals are used by animals and microorganisms for the process of mineralizing structures, called biomineralization, used to construct bones, seashells, eggshells, exoskeletons and mollusc shells.

Essential chemical elements for humans

At least twenty chemical elements are known to be required to support human biochemical processes by serving structural and functional roles as well as electrolytes.

Oxygen, hydrogen, carbon and nitrogen are the most abundant elements in the body by weight and make up about 96% of the weight of a human body. Calcium makes up 920 to 1200 grams of adult body weight, with 99% of it contained in bones and teeth. This is about 1.5% of body weight. Phosphorus occurs in amounts of about 2/3 of calcium, and makes up about 1% of a person's body weight. The other major minerals (potassium, sodium, chlorine, sulfur and magnesium) make up only about 0.85% of the weight of the body. Together these eleven chemical elements (H, C, N, O, Ca, P, K, Na, Cl, S, Mg) make up 99.85% of the body. The remaining ~18 ultratrace minerals comprise just 0.15% of the body, or about one hundred grams in total for the average person. Total fractions in this paragraph are amounts based on summing percentages from the article on chemical composition of the human body

Different opinions exist about the essential nature of various ultratrace elements in humans (and other mammals), even based on the same data. For example, there is no scientific consensus on whether chromium is an essential trace element in humans. The United States and Japan designate chromium as an essential nutrient, but the European Food Safety Authority (EFSA), representing the European Union, reviewed the question in 2014 and does not agree.

Most of the known and suggested mineral nutrients are of relatively low atomic weight, and are reasonably common on land, or for sodium and iodine, in the ocean:

Roles in biological processes

RDA = Recommended Dietary Allowance; AI= Adequate intake; UL = Tolerable upper intake level; Figures shown are for adults age 31–50, male or female neither pregnant nor lactating

* One serving of seaweed exceeds the US UL of 1100 μg but not the 3000 μg UL set by Japan.

Blood concentrations of minerals

Minerals are present in a healthy human being's blood at certain mass and molar concentrations. The figure below presents the concentrations of each of the chemical elements discussed in this article, from center-right to the right. Depending on the concentrations, some are in upper part of the picture, while others are in the lower part. The figure includes the relative values of other constituents of blood such as hormones. In the figure, minerals are color highlighted in purple.

Dietary nutrition
Dietitians may recommend that minerals are best supplied by ingesting specific foods rich with the chemical element(s) of interest. The elements may be naturally present in the food (e.g., calcium in dairy milk) or added to the food (e.g., orange juice fortified with calcium; iodized salt fortified with iodine). Dietary supplements can be formulated to contain several different chemical elements (as compounds), a combination of vitamins and/or other chemical compounds, or a single element (as a compound or mixture of compounds), such as calcium (calcium carbonate, calcium citrate) or magnesium (magnesium oxide), or iron (ferrous sulfate, iron bis-glycinate).

The dietary focus on chemical elements derives from an interest in supporting the biochemical reactions of metabolism with the required elemental components. Appropriate intake levels of certain chemical elements have been demonstrated to be required to maintain optimal health. Diet can meet all the body's chemical element requirements, although supplements can be used when some recommendations are not adequately met by the diet. An example would be a diet low in dairy products, and hence not meeting the recommendation for calcium.

Safety
The gap between recommended daily intake and what are considered safe upper limits (ULs) can be small. For example, for calcium the U.S. Food and Drug Administration set the recommended intake for adults over 70 years at 1,200 mg/day and the UL at 2,000 mg/day. The European Union also sets recommended amounts and upper limits, which are not always in accord with the U.S. Likewise, Japan, which sets the UL for iodine at 3000 μg versus 1100 for the U.S. and 600 for the EU. In the table above, magnesium appears to be an anomaly as the recommended intake for adult men is 420 mg/day (women 350 mg/day) while the UL is lower than the recommended, at 350 mg. The reason is that the UL is specific to consuming more than 350 mg of magnesium all at once, in the form of a dietary supplement, as this may cause diarrhea. Magnesium-rich foods do not cause this problem.

Elements considered possibly essential for humans but not confirmed
Many ultratrace elements have been suggested as essential, but such claims have usually not been confirmed. Definitive evidence for efficacy comes from the characterization of a biomolecule containing the element with an identifiable and testable function. One problem with identifying efficacy is that some elements are innocuous at low concentrations and are pervasive (examples: silicon and nickel in solid and dust), so proof of efficacy is lacking because deficiencies are difficult to reproduce. Ultratrace elements of some minerals such as silicon and boron are known to have a role but the exact biochemical nature is unknown, and others such as arsenic are suspected to have a role in health, but with weaker evidence.

Mineral ecology

Minerals can be bioengineered by bacteria which act on metals to catalyze mineral dissolution and precipitation. Mineral nutrients are recycled by bacteria distributed throughout soils, oceans, freshwater, groundwater, and glacier meltwater systems worldwide. Bacteria absorb dissolved organic matter containing minerals as they scavenge phytoplankton blooms. Mineral nutrients cycle through this marine food chain, from bacteria and phytoplankton to flagellates and zooplankton, which are then eaten by other marine life. In terrestrial ecosystems, fungi have similar roles as bacteria, mobilizing minerals from matter inaccessible by other organisms, then transporting the acquired nutrients to local ecosystems.

See also

 Food composition
 Human nutrition
 Micronutrient
 Mineral deficiency

References

Further reading
 Humphrey Bowen (1979) Environmental Chemistry of the Elements. Academic Press, .
 Humphry Bowen (1966) Trace Elements in Biochemistry. Academic Press.

External links

 
Concept of a nutritious food: toward a nutrient density score
Metals in Nutrition

Essential nutrients

ca:Bioelement#Bioelements secundaris